Galeria Krakowska is a shopping mall in Kraków, Poland, located adjacent to the city's main railway station.

Development 
Galeria Krakowska has 270 specialty shops, cafés, and restaurants on three floors in  two roof-covered shopping malls and three plazas.

It is part of an urban renewal project named ‘Nowe Miasto’ where instead of building shopping centres in greenfield land, the German project developer, ECE developed Galeria Krakowska in the busy inner city.  Galeria Krakowska set new standards in architecture of shopping centers in Poland, and the development received the 2008 ICSC European Shopping Center Award in the category of "New Developments: Large".

See also
 List of shopping malls in Poland

References

External links 

Galeria Krakowska official webpage

Shopping malls in Poland
Buildings and structures in Kraków
Tourist attractions in Kraków
Shopping malls established in 2006